Joshua Andrew Borja (born 1 August 1990) is an American born Guamanian footballer.

Career
Borja started with soccer at Albion SC in San Diego for youth until 17. Played for US Development Academy Los Angeles Galaxy U18's. Competed on the Varsity team as a freshman in High School for the West Hills Wolf Pack, he was a 4-year varsity player on the soccer team club West Hills High School in Santee, San Diego County, California. In his last year of the High School played for the U-18 team of Los Angeles Galaxy. He graduated 2009 by the West Hills High School and joined to studies the Chico State University. Borja played two years in the soccer team of Chico State Wildcats, before joined the USL Premier Development League team Orange County Blue Star. After one season with Orange County, signed in Springtime 2012 for SoCal Elite.

International
He has been capped for the Guam national football team and played from 2009 to current, in 14 games and scored five goals.

References

External links
 

1990 births
Living people
Association football midfielders
Guamanian footballers
Guam international footballers
American soccer players
Orange County Blue Star players
California State University, Chico alumni
Soccer players from San Diego
Chico State Wildcats men's soccer players